Hellula phidilealis, the cabbage budworm moth, is a moth of the family Crambidae. It is found in tropical and subtropical America. From the southern United States (Florida to Arizona), north in the east to North Carolina, south through southwestern Mexico to northern South America, including several islands in the Caribbean.

The wingspan is about 15 mm. The forewing is brownish yellow mottled with white patches, especially in the basal half and a crescent-shaped grayish-brown spot near distal end of cell. The hindwing is light gray.

The larvae are a pest on cabbages. Young larvae bore into buds, stems, and stalks of crucifers and related weeds, including cabbage, turnip, beet, collard, cauliflower, kale, rutabaga, radish, kohlrabi, mustard, rape, horseradish, shepherd's purse and purslane. Older larvae spin silken webs on leaves and feed on outer leaves during the day within these webs.

References

External links
Moths of Jamaica
Images
BugGuide

Glaphyriini
Moths described in 1859